DeMarvin Leal (born July 1, 2000) is an American football defensive end for the Pittsburgh Steelers of the National Football League (NFL). He played college football at Texas A&M. He was named a consensus All-American as a junior in 2021.

Early years
Leal attended Judson High School in Converse, Texas. He played in the 2019 U.S. Army All-American Game. He committed to Texas A&M University to play college football.

College career
As a true freshman at Texas A&M in 2019, Leal played in all 13 games and had seven starts. He recorded 38 tackles and two sacks. He returned as a starter his sophomore year in 2020. He started all nine games, recording 37 tackles, 2.5 sacks, and an interception.

During the 2021 season, he was named a midseason All-American by the Sporting News, Associated Press, and The Athletic. Leal completed the season with 58 tackles, 12.5 tackles for loss and eight sacks, and was named a consensus All-American. Leal decided to forgo his final year of eligibility and enter the 2022 NFL Draft.

Statistics

Professional career

Leal was drafted by the Pittsburgh Steelers in the third round, 84th overall, of the 2022 NFL Draft. He made his NFL debut in Week 1 against the Cincinnati Bengals. He recorded his first start in Week 5 against the Buffalo Bills. He was placed on injured reserve on October 15, 2022.  He returned in Week 13. He finished his rookie season with two starts in 11 appearances. He had 14 total tackles and three passes defensed.

References

External links
 Pittsburgh Steelers bio
Texas A&M Aggies bio

2000 births
Living people
Players of American football from San Antonio
American football defensive ends
American football defensive tackles
Texas A&M Aggies football players
All-American college football players
Pittsburgh Steelers players
Judson High School alumni